Pylartes is a genus of moths of the family Crambidae. It was described by Francis Walker in 1863.

Species
Pylartes subcostalis Walker, 1863
Pylartes totuanalis (Schaus, 1927)

References

External links

Spilomelinae
Crambidae genera
Taxa named by Francis Walker (entomologist)